John Downing (born 1936) is a Canadian writer.

John Downing may also refer to:

John Downing (educational psychologist) (1922–1987)
John D. H. Downing (fl. 1960s–2010s), communications scholar
John Downing (photographer), (1940–2020), British photographer
John F. Downing (fl. 1910s–1920s), American architect
Jack Downing (footballer) (John Westness Downing, 1913–1962), English footballer

See also
John Downing Jr. House, a historic house in Middleport, Ohio
Jack Downing (disambiguation)